Hiroko Fujii (born 18 October 1982) is a Japanese table tennis player. Her highest career ITTF ranking was 26.

References

1982 births
Living people
Japanese female table tennis players
Asian Games medalists in table tennis
Table tennis players at the 2006 Asian Games
Table tennis players at the 2010 Asian Games
Asian Games bronze medalists for Japan
Medalists at the 2010 Asian Games